Countrytime may refer to:

 Countrytime (1960s TV series), a 1960-66 Canadian agricultural information television series
 Countrytime (1970s TV series), a 1970-74 Canadian country music television series
 Country Time, a commercial brand of beverage
 "CountryTime", song by Blanco Brown from Honeysuckle & Lightning Bugs